The 2020–21 Fairfield Stags men's basketball team represented Fairfield University in the 2020–21 NCAA Division I men's basketball season. The Stags, led by second-year head coach Jay Young, played their home games at Alumni Hall in Fairfield, Connecticut as members of the Metro Atlantic Athletic Conference. They finished the season 10–17, 7–11 in MAAC play to finish in a tie for sixth place. As the No. 7 seed in the MAAC tournament, they defeated No. 10 seed Manhattan in the first round, upset No. 2 seed Monmouth in the quarterfinals, upset No. 3 seed Saint Peter's in the semifinals to reach the championship game, where they lost to No. 9 seed Iona 51–60.

Previous season
The Stags finished the 2019–20 season 12–20, 8–12 in MAAC play to finish in a tie for eighth place. They lost in the first round of the MAAC tournament to Manhattan.

Roster

Schedule and results 

|-
!colspan=12 style=| Regular season

|-
!colspan=12 style=| MAAC tournament
|-

|-

Source

References

Fairfield Stags men's basketball seasons
Fairfield Stags
Fairfield Stags men's basketball
Fairfield Stags men's basketball